Cyclic glycine-proline (cGP) is a small neuroactive peptide that belongs to a group of bioactive 2,5-diketopiperazines (2,5-DKPs) and is also known as cyclo-glycine-proline. cGP is a neutral, stable naturally occurring compound and is endogenous to the human body; found in human plasma, breast milk and cerebrospinal fluid.  DKPs are bioactive compounds often found in foods. Cyclic dipeptides such as 2,5 DKPs are formed by the cyclisation of two amino acids of linear peptides produced in heated or fermented foods. The bioactivity of cGP is a property of functional foods and presents in several matrices of foods including blackcurrants.

cGP is metabolite of hormone insulin-like growth factor-1 (IGF-1). It has a cyclic structure, lipophilic nature, and is enzymatically stable which makes its a more favorable candidate for manipulating the binding-release process between IGF-1 and its binding protein thereby, normalizing IGF-1 function.

IGF-1 family 

Insulin growth factor-1 (IGF-1) is a hormone that is structurally very similar to insulin and mediates the effects of growth hormone (GH) thus affecting metabolism, regeneration, and overall development. The GH-IGF-1 signaling pathway is crucial in the process of vascular remodeling and angiogenesis, i.e., the process of building new blood vessels and thus, helps in maintaining blood circulation in the body. In the brain, IGF-1 is abundant in various cells and regions and research over the years, suggest an imperative role of IGF-1 activity in neurodevelopment making it critical in learning and memory.

The IGF-1 family comprises
 IGF-1,
 IGF receptors (IGF-1R) and
 IGF binding proteins (IGFBP).

The therapeutic applications of IGF-1 are limited due to its poor central uptake and potential side-effects. IGF-1 that is not bound to its binding protein bares a very short half-life and is cleaved by enzymes to form the tripeptide glycine-proline-glutamate (GPE). However, the enzymatic instability of GPE, with a plasma half-life of less than 4 minutes, is further cleaved to produce the final product, cyclic-Glycine-Proline (cGP).

Biological Role of cGP 
The hepatic production of IGF-1 is controlled by the growth hormone (GH)-IGF-1 axis. The majority of circulating IGF-1 is not bioavailable because of its affinity and binding to
IGF-binding protein (IGFBP), mainly IGFBP3. IGF-1 bioactivity is therefore, tightly
regulated through reversible binding with IGFBP3. It is this binding-release process that
determines the amount of bioavailable IGF-1 in circulation. IGF-1 that is not bound, is
cleaved into an N-terminal tripeptide, Glycine-Proline-Glutamate (GPE) and Des-N-IGF-1. and GPE metabolizes to result in cyclic glycine proline (cGP)

Unbound IGF-1, cleaved at the N-terminal, can be metabolized through a series of
downstream enzymatic reactions to cGP. The N-terminal is the binding site of IGF-1 which
allows cGP to retain the same binding affinity to IGFBP-3 and thus, regulates the
bioavailability of IGF-1 through competitive binding with IGFBP3. An increase in cGP,
would increase competitive advantage and thus, increase the amount of circulating and
therefore, bioavailable IGF-1.
Research shows that cGP can normalize IGF-1 function under pathophysiological conditions
of increased or diminished IGF-1 bioactivity. In vitro studies show that cGP promoted
the activity of IGF-1 when insufficient and inhibited the activity of IGF-1when in excess

Uses  
1) Cognition
Vascular health is critical in maintaining cognitive function. IGF-1 plays an
essential role in vascular remodelling of the brain and supports cognitive retention. Metabolic IGF-1 levels tend to reduce with age and this reduction appears to
be a major contributor to cognitive impairment in older populations.
Low or deficient IGF-1 levels can be normalized by cGP, restoring its vascular
function. Studies evaluating cGP, IGF-1 and IGFBP3 levels suggest that cGP
concentration and cGP/IGF-1 molar ratio were positively associated suggesting that
older people with higher plasma cGP concentration (and cGP/IGF-1 molar ratio) have
better memory/cognitive retention.

2) Hypertension
IGF-1 plays a critical role in energy metabolism with deficient IGF-1 levels being
implicated in obesity and hypertension.

3) Stroke
The role of IGF-1 in supporting recovery from stroke, which is a condition of vascular
origin, is reported. A study in 34 stroke patients reported that patients with
higher plasma concentration of cGP made better recovery within 3 months than those
with lower cGP levels. Further, patients with higher cGP levels also showed lesser
neurological deficits.

4) Therapeutic Potential
Excessive IGF-1 activity promotes tumorigenesis  while reduced IGF-1 activity
is linked with diseases such as Alzheimer’s  and Parkinson’s. cGP
normalises the autocrine function of IGF-1 under pathological conditions and when
there are low levels of cGP in the human body, IGF-1 regulation is compromised. Therefore, it is reasonable to assume that treatment with exogenous cGP could assist
with improving IGF-1 implicated health benefits.

References 

Neuropeptides
Diketopiperazines
Heterocyclic compounds with 2 rings